Highway 269 (AR 269, Ark. 269, and Hwy. 269) is a state highway in Woodruff County. The route of  runs from US Highway 49 (US 49) north to Highway 37. The route is maintained by the Arkansas State Highway and Transportation Department (AHTD).

Route description

The highway begins at US 49 in eastern Woodruff County within the Arkansas Delta between Hillemann and Bemis. The route begins due west to an intersection with the southern terminus of Highway 145 before turning due north and running as a section line road through a rural, agricultural area. Highway 269 crosses the Union Pacific Railroad tracks before meeting US 64. These two routes form a concurrency west for  until Highway 269 turns north toward Pumpkin Bend. The highway crosses Bayou DeView and turns due west at Pumpkin Bend to terminate at Highway 37 near the Cache River National Wildlife Refuge.

History
Highway 269 was created by the Arkansas State Highway Commission on July 10, 1957 by adding a county road between US 64 at Morton and Pumpkin Bend to the state highway system. The highway was extended south from US 64 (along the current alignment) on December 2, 1964, replacing a Highway 39 designation when Highway 39 was moved east onto a new alignment (this Highway 39 designation would later be supplanted by US 49, which remains today).

The route was extended west of Pumpkin Bend on June 23, 1965. The westernmost segment of the highway was rerouted in 1967 onto a new, more direct alignment.

Major intersections

See also

Notes

References

External links

 

269
Transportation in Woodruff County, Arkansas